A referendum on government policy was held in Cambodia on 5 June 1960. Voters were offered four choices of policies to approve; those of Norodom Sihanouk, Son Ngoc Thanh or the communists, with a fourth choice of being "indifferent". Sihanouk's policies received all but 359 of the two million ballots cast.

Results

References

Referendums in Cambodia
1960 in Cambodia
1960 referendums